The Kavieng Urban LLG is a local government area in New Ireland Province, Papua New Guinea. The LLG is located in Kavieng District and the LLG headquarters is Kavieng. This LLG has six wards. The population is 16,725 (Census 2011) and the Lord Mayor is Hon. Stanley Mansini MPA.

Wards
04. Bagail
05. Kulangit
06. Maiom
80. Kavieng Urban

References

Local-level governments of New Ireland Province